Gareth Owen (born 3 July 1992) is an English professional rugby league footballer who plays for Oldham (Heritage No. 1336) in Betfred League 1.

Background
Owen was born in Oldham, Greater Manchester, England.

References

External links
Oldham R.L.F.C. profile

1992 births
Living people
English rugby league players
Oldham R.L.F.C. captains
Oldham R.L.F.C. players
Rugby league hookers
Rugby league players from Oldham
Salford Red Devils players
Sheffield Eagles players